Matthew Levi Tauiliili (born ~2002) is a Samoan archer who has represented Samoa at the Pacific Games.

Tauiliili is from Lotoso’a Saleimoa on the island of Upolu.

At the 2019 Pacific Games in Apia he won a bronze medal (alongside Naifoua Vise Timai) in the mixed team compound after Samoan Prime Minister Tuila'epa Sa'ilele Malielegaoi withdrew to give him a place in the final.

References

Living people
People from Gaga'emauga
Samoan male archers
Year of birth missing (living people)